Ukraine competed at the 1993 Summer Universiade in Buffalo, New York, United States, from 8 to 18 July 1993. Ukraine did not compete in baseball, football, tennis, volleyball, and water polo (though the country sent officials for the football, volleyball, and water polo competitions). Ukrainian women's basketball team finished 7th.

Medal summary

Medal by sports

Medalists

See also
 Ukraine at the 1993 Winter Universiade

References

1993 Summer Universiade
1993 in Ukrainian sport
1993